Gotham may refer to:

Places

United Kingdom
 Gotham, Dorset, a hamlet near Verwood, Dorset, England
 Gotham, Nottinghamshire, England

United States
 New York City; see Nicknames of New York City
 Gotham, Wisconsin 
 Gotham Comedy Club, a venue for stand-up comedy in New York City

Media and entertainment

Film, television and video games
 Gotham (film), a 1988 thriller
 Gotham Awards, given for cinema achievement
 Gotham Games, a video game publisher
 Project Gotham Racing, video game franchise
 Gotham (TV series), a Fox live-action television prequel of the Batman franchise

Books, magazines and print
Gotham City, fictional home of DC Comics' Batman
Gotham (magazine), targeted at affluent New Yorkers
Gotham: A History of New York City to 1898, a 1998 book by American historians Edwin G. Burrows and Mike Wallace
Gotham Academy, fictional school
Gotham Books, an imprint of Penguin Books
Gotham Gazette, a journal in New York City
"Gotham", a poem by Charles Churchill

Music
 Gotham (album), 1999 album by Bauhaus
 Gotham City, 1981 album by Dexter Gordon
 Gotham (band), New York City horn rock band from the early 1970s
 Gotham!, 2002 album by the band Radio 4
 Gotham Chamber Opera, opera company in New York City
 Gotham Records, an American rhythm and blues label

Organizations
 Gotham Bar and Grill, a New American restaurant in New York City
 Gotham Book Mart, a bookstore and literary salon in Manhattan
 Gotham Entertainment Group, a South Asian publishing company
 Gotham, Inc., an advertising agency
 Gotham Writers' Workshop, an adult writing academy

People
 Gotham Chopra (born 1975), American media entrepreneur and film/TV documentary director, son of author Deepak Chopra
 Nic Gotham (1959–2013), Canadian jazz saxophonist and composer
 Rich Gotham (born 1964), president of the Boston Celtics
 GothamChess, username of American chess YouTuber IM Levy Rozman (born 1995)

Railways
 Gotham, a train operated by Amtrak as part of the Clocker service between Philadelphia and New York City
Gotham Curve, until 1967 the sharpest curve on a standard gauge railway line in the UK

Sports teams 
 NJ/NY Gotham FC, a professional women's soccer club, known as Sky Blue FC prior to 2021
 New York Gothams and Brooklyn Gothams, a team in the American Basketball League
 New York Gothams, the original name of baseball's New York/San Francisco Giants

Other uses
 Gotham (typeface), by designer Tobias Frere-Jones
 Palantir Gotham, a data-mining platform by Palantir Technologies

See also
 Gotham Screen Film Festival & Screenplay Contest, a New York City film festival
 
 Gothem, a settlement on the Swedish island of Gotland